Edward David "Ted" Jones, Jr. (December 18, 1925  October 3, 1990), the son of the founder of Edward Jones Investments, later ran the firm and built its signature small town brokerage system. He devoted his last years along with his wife Pat Jones to establishing the Katy Trail State Park and the Prairie Fork Conservation Area in Missouri.

Biography 
Jones was born in St. Louis, Missouri and studied agriculture at the University of Missouri. After serving with the Merchant Marines in World War II he returned to the University of Missouri and in 1947 worked as a page on the floor of the New York Stock Exchange. He worked for a year at Josephthal & Co.

He returned to St. Louis in 1948 to work for his father Edward D. Jones. Jones instituted the firm's branch office business model and oversaw the opening of the first one-person branch office in Mexico, Missouri. He was managing partner of the firm from 1968 to 1980 during which the firm expanded to 300 branch offices.

In the last 10 years of his life, he donated $2.2 million for Missouri to acquire property along 200 miles of abandoned Missouri–Kansas–Texas Railroad rail tracks to form a bicycle path for the Katy Trail State Park. The planned eastern terminus of the park is the confluence of the Missouri River and Mississippi River. In 2004 the park at the confluence was named Edward "Ted" and Pat Jones-Confluence Point State Park in honor of his wife and him.

Differentiating himself from other corporate CEOs, Ted Jones allowed employees to buy into his partnership. At the time the most profitable firms in and around Missouri had started to go public by selling stock. Ted Jones bucked that trend and kept Edward Jones a partnership instead of a publicly held firm beholden to public shareholders and quarterly profits.

In 2015 Edward "Ted" Jones, Jr. was inducted into the "Hall of Famous Missourians" during a ceremony at the state capitol.

References

Edward D. "Ted" Jones biography

Businesspeople from St. Louis
1925 births
1990 deaths
Jones, Edward D. "Ted"
American investment bankers
20th-century American businesspeople